This is a list of monuments that are classified by the Moroccan ministry of culture around Sidi Ifni.

Monuments and sites in Sidi Ifni 

|}

References 

Sidi Ifni
Sidi Ifni Province